The 1988–89 NC State Wolfpack men's basketball team represented North Carolina State University as a member of the Atlantic Coast Conference during the 1988–89 men's college basketball season. It was Jim Valvano's 9th season as head coach.

Roster

Schedule

|-
!colspan=12 style=| Regular season

|-
!colspan=12 style=| ACC Tournament

|-
!colspan=12 style=| NCAA Tournament

Rankings

References

NC State Wolfpack men's basketball seasons
Nc State
Nc State
NC State Wolfpack men's basketball
NC State Wolfpack men's basketball